Viratnagar Assembly constituency is one of constituencies of Rajasthan Legislative Assembly in the Jaipur Rural (Lok Sabha constituency).

Viratnagar constituency covers all voters from Viratnagar tehsil; part of Kotputli tehsil, which includes ILRC Paota; and part of Shahpura tehsil, which includes Chhapra Khurd, Nathawala, Rampura and Saiwar of ILRC Shahpura. Paota and viratnagar is the key point of winning Viratnagar.

References

See also 
 Member of the Legislative Assembly (India)

Jaipur district
Assembly constituencies of Rajasthan